Lauri Elias Simojoki (28 January 1899 – 25 January 1940) was a Finnish clergyman who became a leading figure in the country's far right movement.

The son of a clergyman, Simojoki was born on 28 January 1899 in Rautio. As a youth he saw service in the struggle for Finnish independence and then with the Forest Guerrillas in East Karelia. A student in theology at the University of Helsinki, he became involved in the formation of Academic Karelia Society, serving as chairman from 1922-1923 and secretary from 1923-1924. He advocated the union of all Finnish people into a Greater Finland whilst in this post. Strongly influenced by Russophobia, the student Simojoki addressed a rally on 'Kalevala Day' in 1923 with the slogan "In the name of Finland's lost honour and her coming greatness, death to the Ruskis."

Simojoki was ordained as a minister in 1925 and he held the chaplaincy at Kiuruvesi from 1929 until his death. He became involved with the Patriotic People's Movement and, in 1933, took command of their youth movement, Sinimustat (The Blue-and-Blacks), which looked for inspiration to similar movements amongst fascist parties in Germany and Italy. The movement was banned in 1936 due to its involvement in revolutionary activity in Estonia, although Simojoki continued to serve as a leading member of the Patriotic People's Movement. He was a Member of Parliament in  1933-1939. He founded a second youth group, Mustapaidat (the Black Shirts), in 1937, although this proved less successful.

When the Winter War broke out in 1939, Simojoki enlisted as a chaplain in the Finnish Army. He was killed in action on Koirinoja's ice in Impilahti, while putting down a wounded horse in no man's land. After the Finnish troops were unable to put down the horse from their positions, Simojoki skied to the horse and euthanized it with a pistol. Having done that, he was gunned down by a Soviet machine gun.

References

1899 births
1940 deaths
People from Kalajoki
People from Oulu Province (Grand Duchy of Finland)
20th-century Finnish Lutheran clergy
Patriotic People's Movement (Finland) politicians
Members of the Parliament of Finland (1933–36)
Members of the Parliament of Finland (1936–39)
People of the Finnish Civil War (White side)
University of Helsinki alumni
Finnish military personnel killed in World War II
Deaths by firearm in Finland
Anti-Russian sentiment
Finnish fascists